All Our Saturdays (1981–1986) is a retrospective CD compilation of Rational Youth songs. The CD booklet contains a discography, a band biography written by vocalist and band mastermind Tracy Howe, and Howe's comments to each track. As a result, Howe, whose e-mail address was also printed, received hundreds of mails from fans; positive feedback which ultimately led to the reunion of Howe and co-founder Bill Vorn.

Track listing
"Saturdays In Silesia (Previously Unreleased Re-mix)" – 4:06
"No More And No Less" – 4:05
"Heredity" – 4:16
"Close To Nature" (Previously Unreleased Re-mix) – 4:16
"I've Got A Sister In The Navy" (Unreleased Extended Version) – 6:57
"Holiday In Bangkok" – 5:15
"May Day 1984" (Previously Unreleased) – 3:31
"In Your Eyes – 3:11
"Call Me – 2:59
"Beat The Bad Times Down" – 3:26
"Speak To Me In Dreams" – 4:19
"Freeze – 4:59
"Latin Lovers" (edit) – 2:49
"Hot Streets" – 2:55
"Pile Ou Face" – 2:38
"City Of Night" (Extended Version) – 7:10
"Saturdays In Silesia" (Extended Version) – 7:16

References

Rational Youth albums
1996 compilation albums